Oxford Road Cemetery is a Commonwealth War Graves Commission burial ground for the dead of the First World War located near Ypres (Ieper) in Belgium on the Western Front.

The cemetery grounds were assigned to the United Kingdom in perpetuity by King Albert I of Belgium in recognition of the sacrifices made by the British Empire in the defence and liberation of Belgium during the war.

Foundation

The cemetery, named after the nickname of a nearby road behind the trenches, was established as two cemeteries. The first was laid down in August 1917. The second, nearby, was begun in 1917. After the armistice, battlefield graves were consolidated between the two, creating one enlarged cemetery.

The cemetery was designed by Sir Reginald Blomfield.

Notable graves
South African-born Captain Clement Robertson VC is buried in this cemetery. He was posthumously awarded the Victoria Cross for valour on 4 October 1917 at Zonnebeke.

Sergeant Colin Blythe of the King's Own Yorkshire Light Infantry, an exceptional spin bowler who had played for Kent and England and was a Wisden Cricketer of the Year in 1904.

References

External links
 
 Oxford Road Cemetery at Find a Grave

Commonwealth War Graves Commission cemeteries in Belgium
Cemeteries and memorials in West Flanders